The 2011 Citi Open was a women's tennis tournament played on outdoor hard courts. It was the 1st edition of the Citi Open, and was a part of the WTA International tournaments of the 2011 WTA Tour. It took place at the College Park, Maryland in Washington, D.C., United States, from July 26 through July 31, 2011. Nadia Petrova won the singles title.

WTA entrants

Seeds

 Seedings are based on the rankings of July 18, 2011.

Other entrants
The following players received wildcards into the singles main draw
  Eugenie Bouchard
  Misaki Doi
  Nadia Petrova
  Sloane Stephens

The following players received entry from the qualifying draw:

  Madison Brengle
  Ryōko Fuda
  Alexandra Mueller
  Petra Rampre

Finals

Singles

 Nadia Petrova defeated  Shahar Pe'er, 7–5, 6–2.
 It was Petrova's 1st title of the year and 10th of her career.

Doubles

 Sania Mirza /  Yaroslava Shvedova defeated  Olga Govortsova /  Alla Kudryavtseva, 6–3, 6–3

References

External links

 Citi Open website
 Women's Tennis Association website

Citi Open
Citi Open
Citi Open
Citi Open
Washington Open (tennis)